Johi is a town of Dadu District, Sindh province, Pakistan which is located between Balochistan and the Sindh province border. Johi town is also Taluka of Dadu District. A civil hospital is also in Johi. Johi is commonly known as the historical area and has many villages like Haji Khan Hairo Khan, Bazmaal Khoso, Drigh Bala, Rajaghanda and many similar villages. It has many visiting places people here depend on the rain water and do crops as land is very rich in minerals. The ancient place of Ghazi Shah Mound is located near Johi towards west-south.The Buddhist monument Thul Hairo Khan is towards its north-west. It has historical town Wahi Pandhi and at a distance of 50 km from Wahi Pandhi Taluka Johi there is  Gorakh Hill Station. Which is situated in Kirthar Mountains Range and in mountainous area of Johi many water streams and hill torrents known as Nai Gaj, Taqi, Nali  and many other flow towards Kachho desert. Shiva Mandir Johi is one of the main old religious and sacred places in Johi town.

See also
 List of Hindu temples in Pakistan

References 

 

Dadu District